Corey Anderson (born 25 May 2000) is an Australian para-athlete who competes in the F38 category in throwing events. He won the gold medal in the Men's Javelin F38 at the 2019 World Para Athletics Championships in Dubai. He represented Australia at the 2020 Tokyo Summer Paralympics.

Personal 
Anderson was born on 25 May 2000. He has left hemiplegic cerebral palsy which was diagnosed after 2017. He lives in Toowoomba, Queensland.

Sporting career 
He won the silver medal in the Men's Javelin at the 2017 INAS Athletics Championships, Bangkok, Thailand. During the competition, his mother noticed he moved differently than other athletes and he was subsequently diagnosed with left hemiplegic cerebral palsy. He transferred to competing in Paralympic throwing events and is classified as F38 athlete. At the 2019 Australian Athletics Championships in Sydney, New South Wales, he set a new world record in the men's javelin F38 with a throw of 55.14 m.

At the 2019 World Para Athletics Championships in Dubai, in winning the gold medal in the Men's Javelin F38 he broke his own world record with a throw of 56.28 m. He competed at the championships under duress due to rolling his ankle several days prior to the event.

At the 2020 Tokyo Summer Paralympics, he finished fourth in the Men's Javelin F38 with a throw of 54.48.

Anderson is coached by Desmond Davis  and is a Queensland Academy of Sport scholarship athlete.

Recognition 

 2017 – Sports Darling Downs Junior Para Athlete of the Year.
 2018 – Sports Darling Downs Para Athlete of the Year.

References

External links
International Paralympic Committee Profile
Paralympics Australia Profile
Get to Know Corey Anderson – Youtube

Track and field athletes with cerebral palsy
Cerebral Palsy category Paralympic competitors
World record holders in Paralympic athletics
Athletes (track and field) at the 2020 Summer Paralympics
2000 births
Living people
Australian male javelin throwers
21st-century Australian people